The Reward of the Faithless is a 1917 American silent drama film directed by Rex Ingram and starring Claire Du Brey, Betty Schade and Wedgwood Nowell.

Cast
 Claire Du Brey as Princess Dione 
 Betty Schade as Anna 
 Wedgwood Nowell as Guido Campanelli 
 Nicholas Dunaew as Feodor Strogoff 
 Dick La Reno as Prince Paul Ragusin 
 William J. Dyer as Peter Vlasoff 
 Yvette Mitchell as Anna Vlasoff 
 J. Edwin Brown as Karl 
 Bill Rathbone as A Cripple

References

Bibliography
 Leonhard Gmür. Rex Ingram: Hollywood's Rebel of the Silver Screen. 2013.

External links
 

1917 films
1917 drama films
1910s English-language films
American silent feature films
Silent American drama films
Films directed by Rex Ingram
American black-and-white films
Universal Pictures films
1910s American films
English-language drama films